The Rizal class was a ship class of two patrol corvettes formerly operated by the Philippine Navy. These ships were formerly used by the US Navy as Auk class minesweepers. Under the Philippine Navy, the two vessels have undergone upgrades and modification, and were categorized as corvettes.

Both ships have been retired from service by the Philippine Navy.

History
The Auk class of naval ships were Allied minesweepers serving with the United States Navy and the British Royal Navy during the Second World War. In total, there were a recorded 95 Auk class minesweepers under Allied command during that time.

Thirty-two minesweepers were ordered by the US (as BAM-1 to 32) intending them to be supplied to the Royal Navy under Lend-lease but 12 were retained for USN use and given names and "AM" hull classification prefix. Those transferred were given "J" pennant number prefixes and formed the Catherine class

Eleven minesweepers of the Auk class were lost in World War II; only one (USS Skill) was sunk — by U-593.

Out of the reserved US Navy units, two were transferred to the Philippines as part of the US Military Assistance Program, these were USS Murrelet (renamed BRP Rizal) in 1965, and USS Vigilance (renamed BRP Quezon) in 1967.

Both ships were stricken in 1994, but were overhauled with assistance from Hatch & Kirk, Inc.,  and returned to service in 1995–1996. Recent upgrades include a satellite radio dish for communications. As of 2008, both ships are still on the active roster of the Philippine Navy, and are assigned with the Patrol Force.

With over 50 years of active duty with the Philippine Navy, both have been involved in local and international crisis, exercises, and incidents.

Technical details
Although fairly armed for her size, her weapon systems are manually operated and are of World War II origin.

The two Mk24 3"/50 caliber guns, the ships' primary weapons, have a range of up to  yards and are also capable of anti-aircraft warfare.

In addition to the above-mentioned guns, she also carries a total of two twin Mk1 Bofors 40 mm anti-aircraft guns, two twin Mk4 20 mm Oerlikon cannons, and four 50 caliber machine guns.

The ship is powered by two EMD 16-645E7 diesel engines with a combined power of around  driving two propellers.

Ships in Class

Gallery

See also
 Philippine Navy
 Auk class minesweeper
 List of decommissioned ships of the Philippine Navy

References

External links
 Philippine Navy Official website
 Philippine Fleet Official Website
 Philippine Defense Forum
 Opus224's Unofficial Philippine Defense Page